The 2000–01 NCAA Division I men's basketball season began on November 8, 2000, progressed through the regular season and conference tournaments, and concluded with the 2001 NCAA Men's Division I Basketball Tournament Championship Game on April 2, 2001 at the Hubert H. Humphrey Metrodome in Minneapolis, Minnesota. The Duke Blue Devils won their third NCAA national championship with an 82–72 victory over the Arizona Wildcats.

Season headlines 
 The preseason AP All-American team was named on November 13. Shane Battier of Duke was the leading vote-getter (71 of 72 votes). The rest of the team included Troy Murphy of Notre Dame (62 votes), Loren Woods of Arizona (46), Joseph Forte of North Carolina (39) and Jamaal Tinsley of Iowa State (39).

Major rule changes 
Beginning in 2000–01, the following rules changes were implemented:
 Technical fouls divided into direct (two-shot penalty) and indirect (one shot penalty) with ball returned to point of interruption.

Season outlook

Pre-season polls 
The top 25 from the AP and ESPN/USA Today Coaches Polls November 9, 2000.

Conference membership changes 

These schools joined new conferences for the 2000–01 season.

Regular season

Conference winners and tournaments

Statistical leaders

Post-season tournaments

NCAA tournament

Final Four – Hubert H. Humphrey Metrodome, Minneapolis, Minnesota

National Invitation tournament

Semifinals & finals 

 Third Place – Memphis 86, Detroit 71

Award winners

Consensus All-American teams

Major player of the year awards 
 Wooden Award: Shane Battier, Duke
 Naismith Award: Shane Battier, Duke
 Associated Press Player of the Year: Shane Battier, Duke
 NABC Player of the Year: Jason Williams, Duke
 Oscar Robertson Trophy (USBWA): Shane Battier, Duke
 Adolph Rupp Trophy: Shane Battier, Duke
 Sporting News Player of the Year: Shane Battier, Duke

Major freshman of the year awards 
 USBWA Freshman of the Year: Eddie Griffin, Seton Hall
 Sporting News Freshman of the Year: Eddie Griffin, Seton Hall

Major coach of the year awards 
 Associated Press Coach of the Year: Matt Doherty, North Carolina
 Henry Iba Award (USBWA): Al Skinner, Boston College
 NABC Coach of the Year: Tom Izzo, Michigan State
 Naismith College Coach of the Year: Rod Barnes, Mississippi
 CBS/Chevrolet Coach of the Year: Al Skinner, Boston College
 Sporting News Coach of the Year: Al Skinner, Boston College

Other major awards 
 Pete Newell Big Man Award (Best big man): Jason Collins, Stanford
 NABC Defensive Player of the Year: Shane Battier, Duke
 Frances Pomeroy Naismith Award (Best player under 6'0): Rashad Phillips, Detroit
 Lowe's Senior CLASS Award (top senior): Shane Battier, Duke
 Robert V. Geasey Trophy (Top player in Philadelphia Big 5): Marvin O'Connor, St. Joseph's
 NIT/Haggerty Award (Top player in New York City metro area): Norman Richardson, Hofstra
 Chip Hilton Player of the Year Award (Strong personal character): Shane Battier, Duke

Coaching changes 

A number of teams changed coaches during the season and after it ended.

References